Oncochila is a genus of lace bugs in the tribe Tingini.  Species are recorded from temperate Asia and Europe and includes O. simplex found in the British Isles.

Species
BioLib lists the following:
 Oncochila loginovae Golub, 1982
 Oncochila scapularis (Fieber, 1844)type species (as Monanthia (Physatocheila) scapularis Fieber)
 Oncochila simplex (Herrich-Schäffer, 1830)
Fossil taxa
 †Oncochila wollastoni (Heer)

References

External Links
 Ukrainian Biodiversity Information Network: Oncochila Stål, 1873 (photos of species)
 Lace Bugs Database: (Tingidae: Oncochila)

Tingidae
Heteroptera genera
Hemiptera of Asia
Hemiptera of Europe